Teenage Wasteland is a 2006 drama film written and directed by Welsh director Andrew Jones. It was funded through the independent film company Steel & Glass Films Ltd. The film is a cinéma vérité style look into the lives of several disenchanted teens and their dysfunctional home lives in Swansea, south Wales.  The cast members are relative unknowns and the characters are all based on people director Jones knew. The scenes featuring the teenagers at home with their parents are shot in black-and-white and the scenes of the teenage characters outside the home are shot in colour.

Plot
The film is centered on three teenagers in South Wales and follows their lives inside and outside their homes, and touches on drugs, sex, and dysfunction through the teenagers' point of view.

Characters
The film's three main characters are:
 Leon  Leon is a sixteen-year-old who outside is very promiscuous as well as being an habitual drinker and drug user. An only child who lives alone with his mother, his father died when he was just ten years old. He has a very close relationship with his mother, which is shattered when she starts seeing a new man, the first boyfriend she has brought home since the death of her husband.
 Clarence  Clarence is a sixteen-year-old who is abused by his stepfather while his alcoholic mother turns a blind eye.
 Nicky  Nicky is a sixteen-year-old girl who is reluctantly being pushed into pursuing a career in modelling by her overbearing parents who live out their dreams through her. They are unaware that she is actually a self-harmer in the early stages of bulimia.

References
official web site
IMDB entry

External links

  https://web.archive.org/web/20070302173416/http://www.teenagewasteland.co.uk/ [server not found]

2006 films
British teen films
British independent films
2000s teen drama films
British drama films
2006 directorial debut films
2006 drama films
2000s English-language films
Films directed by Andrew Jones
2000s British films